Anka Berus (1903–1991), was a Croatian politician (Communist). She was a member of the resistance during the Second World War. In 1945, she became the first female cabinet minister in Croatia.

She was Finance Minister 1945-1953 and Member of the Executive Council of Yugoslavia in 1953-1960.

References 

1903 births
1991 deaths
20th-century Croatian women politicians
Croatia in World War II
Women government ministers of Croatia
20th-century Croatian politicians
Recipients of the Order of the People's Hero
Burials at Mirogoj Cemetery